Hexachlorobenzene, or perchlorobenzene, is an organochloride with the molecular formula C6Cl6. It is a fungicide formerly used as a seed treatment, especially on wheat to control the fungal disease bunt. It has been banned globally under the Stockholm Convention on Persistent Organic Pollutants.

Physical and chemical properties
Hexachlorobenzene is a stable, white, crystalline chlorinated hydrocarbon. It is sparingly soluble in organic solvents such as benzene, diethyl ether and alcohol, but practically insoluble in water with no reaction. It reacts violently above 65 °C with dimethyl formamide and has a flash point of 468 °F. It is stable under normal temperatures and pressures. It is combustible but it does not ignite readily. When heated to decomposition, hexachlorobenzene emits highly toxic fumes of hydrochloric acid, other chlorinated compounds (such as phosgene), carbon monoxide, and carbon dioxide.

Synthesis
Hexachlorobenzene has been made on a laboratory scale since the 1890s, by the electrophilic aromatic substitution reaction of chlorine with benzene or chlorobenzenes. Large-scale manufacture for use as a fungicide was developed by using the residue remaining after purification of the mixture of isomers of hexachlorocyclohexane, from which the insecticide lindane (the γ-isomer) had been removed, leaving the unwanted α- and β- isomers. This mixture is produced when benzene is reacted with chlorine in the presence of ultraviolet light (e.g. from sunlight).

Usage
Hexachlorobenzene was used in agriculture to control the fungus tilletia caries (common bunt of wheat). It is also effective on tilletia controversa, dwarf bunt. The compound was introduced in 1947, normally formulated as a seed dressing but is now banned in many countries.

Safety

Hexachlorobenzene is an animal carcinogen and is considered to be a probable human carcinogen. After its introduction as a fungicide in 1945, for crop seeds, this toxic chemical was found in all food types. Hexachlorobenzene was banned from use in the United States in 1966.

This material has been classified by the International Agency for Research on Cancer (IARC) as a Group 2B carcinogen (possibly carcinogenic to humans). Animal carcinogenicity data for hexachlorobenzene show increased incidences of liver, kidney (renal tubular tumours) and thyroid cancers. Chronic oral exposure in humans has been shown to give rise to a liver disease (porphyria cutanea tarda), skin lesions with discoloration, ulceration, photosensitivity, thyroid effects, bone effects and loss of hair. Neurological changes have been reported in rodents exposed to hexachlorobenzene. Hexachlorobenzene may cause embryolethality and teratogenic effects. Human and animal studies have demonstrated that hexachlorobenzene crosses the placenta to accumulate in foetal tissues and is transferred in breast milk.

HCB is very toxic to aquatic organisms. It may cause long term adverse effects in the aquatic environment. Therefore, release into waterways should be avoided. It is persistent in the environment. Ecological investigations have found that biomagnification up the food chain does occur. Hexachlorobenzene has a half life in the soil of between 3 and 6 years. Risk of bioaccumulation in an aquatic species is high.

Toxicology
 Oral LD50 (rat): 10,000 mg/kg
 Oral LD50 (mice): 4,000 mg/kg
 Inhalation LC50 (rat): 3600 mg/m3
Material has relatively low acute toxicity but is toxic because of its persistent and cumulative nature in body tissues in rich lipid content.

Unique Exposure Incident
In Anatolia, Turkey between 1955 and 1959, during a period when bread wheat was unavailable, 500 people were fatally poisoned and more than 4,000 people fell ill by eating bread made with HCB-treated seed that was intended for agriculture use. Most of the sick were affected with a liver condition called porphyria cutanea tarda, which disturbs the metabolism of hemoglobin and results in skin lesions. Almost all breastfeeding children under the age of two, whose mothers had eaten tainted bread, died from a condition called "pembe yara" or "pink sore", most likely from high doses of HCB in the breast milk. In one mother's breast milk the HCB level was found to be 20 parts per million in lipid, approximately 2,000 times the average levels of contamination found in breast-milk samples around the world. Follow-up studies 20 to 30 years after the poisoning found average HCB levels in breast milk were still more than seven times the average for unexposed women in that part of the world (56 specimens of human milk obtained from mothers with porphyria, average value was 0.51 ppm in HCB-exposed patients compared to 0.07 ppm in unexposed controls), and 150 times the level allowed in cow's milk.

In the same follow-up study of 252 patients (162 males and 90 females, avg. current age of 35.7 years), 20–30 years' postexposure, many subjects had dermatologic, neurologic, and orthopedic symptoms and signs. The observed clinical findings include scarring of the face and hands (83.7%), hyperpigmentation (65%), hypertrichosis (44.8%), pinched faces (40.1%), painless arthritis (70.2%), small hands (66.6%), sensory shading (60.6%), myotonia (37.9%), cogwheeling (41.9%), enlarged thyroid (34.9%), and enlarged liver (4.8%). Urine and stool porphyrin levels were determined in all patients, and 17 have at least one of the porphyrins elevated. Offspring of mothers with three decades of HCB-induced porphyria appear normal.

See also
Chlorobenzene
Dichlorobenzene
Trichlorobenzene
Pentachlorobenzene
Pentachlorobenzenethiol

References
Cited works

Additional references
International Agency for Research on Cancer. In: IARC Monographs on the Evaluation of Carcinogenic Risk to Humans. World Health Organisation, Vol 79, 2001pp 493–567
Registry of Toxic Effects of Chemical Substances. Ed. D. Sweet, US Dept. of Health & Human Services: Cincinnati, 2005.
Environmental Health Criteria No 195; International Programme on Chemical Safety, World health Organization, Geneva, 1997.
Toxicological Profile for Hexachlorobenzene (Update), US Dept of Health & Human Services, Sept 2002.
Merck Index, 11th Edition, 4600

External links
 

Obsolete pesticides
Chloroarenes
Endocrine disruptors
Fungicides
Hazardous air pollutants
IARC Group 2B carcinogens
Persistent organic pollutants under the Stockholm Convention
Suspected teratogens
Suspected embryotoxicants
Persistent organic pollutants under the Convention on Long-Range Transboundary Air Pollution